WBGL (91.7 FM) is a Christian radio station licensed to Champaign, Illinois and owned by the University of Northwestern – St. Paul. Studios are located in Champaign.

Relay stations
WBGL is relayed by 9 full-power FM stations and three low-power FM translators. Their combined footprint provides at least secondary coverage from the outer southern suburbs of Chicago to the Illinois side of the St. Louis area to southeastern Missouri.

Translators

Northwestern Media
WBGL and Peoria-based sister station WCIC are part of Northwestern Media, a ministry of University of Northwestern - St. Paul. Between them, the two stations and their satellites and repeaters cover almost two-thirds of Illinois, as well as portions of Missouri, Iowa, and Indiana.

In August 2019, the Illinois Bible Institute reached an agreement to sell the entire WBGL/WCIC New Life Media Network to the University of Northwestern – St. Paul, which owns and operates a network of contemporary Christian stations and a network of Christian talk and teaching stations, for $9,901,558.34, plus $200,000 in third-party underwriting announcements for the seller's non-broadcast, non-profit activities for one year. The closing date was November 1, 2019.

Former Logo

References

External links
 

Assemblies of God
Contemporary Christian radio stations in the United States
BGL
Radio stations established in 1982
Champaign, Illinois
1982 establishments in Illinois
Pentecostalism in the United States
Northwestern Media
BGL